La Recoleta Cemetery is a cemetery located in the Recoleta neighbourhood of Buenos Aires, Argentina. It contains the graves of notable people, including Eva Perón, presidents of Argentina, Nobel Prize winners, the founder of the Argentine Navy, and military commanders like Julio Argentino Roca. In 2011, the BBC hailed it as one of the world's best cemeteries, and in 2013, CNN listed it among the 10 most beautiful cemeteries in the world.

History
Franciscan Recollect monks arrived in this area, then the outskirts of Buenos Aires, in the early eighteenth century. The cemetery is built around the Recollect Convent and a church, Our Lady of the Pillar, built in 1732.

The order was disbanded in 1822, and the garden of the convent was converted into the first public cemetery in Buenos Aires.

The 1822 layout was done by French civil engineer Próspero Catelin, who also designed the current facade of the Buenos Aires Metropolitan Cathedral. The cemetery was last remodeled in 1881, while Torcuato de Alvear was mayor of the city, by the Italian architect Juan Antonio Buschiazzo.

Description
The entrance to the cemetery is through neo-classical gates with tall Doric columns. The cemetery contains many elaborate marble mausoleums, decorated with statues, in a wide variety of architectural styles such as Art Deco, Art Nouveau, Baroque, and Neo-Gothic, and most materials used between 1880 and 1930 in the construction of tombs were imported from Paris and Milan. The entire cemetery is laid out in sections like city blocks, with wide tree-lined main walkways branching into sidewalks filled with mausoleums. These mausoleums are still being used by rich families in Argentina that have their own vault and keep their deceased there.
While many of the mausoleums are in fine shape and well-maintained, others have fallen into disrepair. Several can be found with broken glass and littered with rubbish. Among many memorials are works by notable Argentine sculptors, Lola Mora and Luis Perlotti for instance. The tomb of Liliana Crociati de Szaszak, due to its unusual design, is of special interest.

Notable interments

References

External links

 
 

National cemeteries
Cemeteries in Buenos Aires
 
Tourist attractions in Buenos Aires
Art Nouveau cemeteries
Art Nouveau architecture in Buenos Aires
1822 establishments in Argentina
Cemeteries established in the 1820s